Chris Lee (born 18 June 1971) is an English former footballer who played as a midfielder.

References

1971 births
Living people
English footballers
Association football midfielders
Rochdale A.F.C. players
Hull City A.F.C. players
English Football League players